Don Juan is a 1950 Spanish romantic adventure film directed by José Luis Sáenz de Heredia and starring Antonio Vilar, Annabella and María Rosa Salgado. It is based on the legend of Don Juan.

The film's sets were designed by the art director Georges Wakhévitch. It was shot at the Estudios Ballesteros in Madrid.

Synopsis
Following the death of his father, Don Juan returns from Venice to his native Seville. He discovers that in order to receive his inheritance he has to marry a particular woman Doña Iñés.

Cast
 Antonio Vilar as Don Juan 
 Annabella as Lady Ontiveras 
 María Rosa Salgado as Doña Iñés de Ulloa 
 Enrique Guitart as Don Luís Mejía 
 José Ramón Giner as Chuti 
 Santiago Rivero as Don Gonzalo de Ulloa 
 Mario Berriatúa as Hernando 
 Fernando Fernández de Córdoba as Don Félix Calderón 
 Mary Lamar as Condesa de Guadix 
 María Asquerino  as Claudina
 Manolo Morán as Arturo 
 Carlos Agostí as Gitano 
 Honorina Fernández as Ama de Doña Inés 
 Mercedes Castellanos as Isabella 
 Jacinto San Emeterio as Octavio 
 Nicolás D. Perchicot as Fray Cardenio 
 Juan Vázquez as Butarelli 
 Francisco Pierrá as Don Diego Tenorio 
 Beni Deus as Capitán del barco 
 Julia Lajos as Posadera

References

Bibliography
 Wright, Sarah. Tales of Seduction: The Figure of Don Juan in Spanish Culture. I.B.Tauris, 2012.

External links 

1950 films
1950s historical adventure films
Spanish historical adventure films
1950s Spanish-language films
Films directed by José Luis Sáenz de Heredia
Cifesa films
Films set in Seville
Spanish black-and-white films
1950s Spanish films